Ansar Razak (18 January 1974 – 30 December 1998) was an Indonesian footballer who played as striker for PSM Makassar and the Indonesia national team.

He died in 1998 in a traffic accident.

References

1974 births
1998 deaths
Association football forwards
Indonesian footballers
Indonesia international footballers
PSM Makassar players
Indonesian Premier Division players
Place of birth missing
Road incident deaths in Indonesia